The 2000–01 United Hockey League season was the 10th season of the United Hockey League (Colonial Hockey League before 1997), a North American minor professional league. 15 teams participated in the regular season and the Quad City Mallards won the league title.

Regular season

Colonial Cup-Playoffs

External links
 Season 2000/01 on hockeydb.com

United Hockey League seasons
UHL
UHL